Liz Cameron is a former Lord Provost of Glasgow.

Born in Partick, Glasgow, she graduated from the University of Glasgow and became a college lecturer, teaching at Bell College of Technology in Hamilton. First elected as a Labour member of the Glasgow District Council in 1992, she was elected to the new City of Glasgow Unitary Authority to represent the Knightswood South ward in 1995.

After having served as convener of the council's Art and Culture Committee from 1998 to 2003, she was unanimously elected by the city council to replace Alex Mosson as Lord Provost in May 2003, a post which she held for four years. After her term as Lord Provost, she sat as a councillor for a further 10 years, before retiring from the council at the 2017 elections.

References

Year of birth missing (living people)
Living people
People from Partick
Scottish Labour councillors
Alumni of the University of Glasgow
Lord Provosts of Glasgow
Women provosts in Scotland
Recipients of the Ordre des Arts et des Lettres
Women councillors in Glasgow